Mark Elliott is an English travel writer best known for books on Azerbaijan, and for unusual map-based route guides for Asia.

Though long out of print, Elliott's Asia Overland co-authored with Wil Klass, garnered something of a cult following among overland travellers during the late 1990s. Elliott's 2003 South-East Asia: The Graphic Guide, also based mostly on schematic maps, remains in considerable demand among travellers with prices for second hand copies reaching absurdly high levels (nearly US$1000 a copy in November 2009). He also contributed to over 50 Lonely Planet guides. Having written the first comprehensive English language guide to post-Soviet Azerbaijan in 1999, a book now in its 5th edition, Elliott has since been described by the press in Azerbaijan as the "legendary writer of the definitive English-language guidebook to the country"

Early life
Elliott's father Ian was the chairman of West Sussex County Council, his mother the teacher and poet, Betty Elliott, nee Gedge. Mark graduated from Durham University where he was President of the Durham Union Society and worked on the university newspaper Palatinate at the same time as Tim Burt, Dave Anderson and Jeremy Vine.

Bibliography
 Asia Overland: A Route and Planning Guide (Hindhead, Surrey: Trailblazer Publications, 1998). Joint author: Will Klass.
 Azerbaijan with Georgia (Hindhead, Surrey: Trailblazer Publications, 1999; Azerbaijan : with Excursions to Georgia, 2010).
 Cultureshock! Belgium (London : Kuperard, and Portland, Oregon: Graphics Art Center Publishing, 2003).
 South-East Asia: The Graphic Guide (Hindhead, Surrey: Trailblazer Publications, 2003)

References

External links
 Interview with Mark Elliott - JSNW (Japan Society North West) and JETAA (JET Alumni Association in the UK) Lecture Series

1963 births
Living people
English travel writers
Alumni of Collingwood College, Durham
Presidents of the Durham Union